The Jon Dore Television Show is a Canadian mockumentary-style comedy television series, created by Jon Dore and John Brunton.  The show stars Canadian actor and comedian Jon Dore, of recent Canadian Idol co-host fame.  The Comedy Network ordered 13 half-hour episodes of the series, which premiered on October 17, 2007 at 10pm ET. The second season premiered on January 21, 2009. A third season was supposed to be premiered in 2010 until Dore confirmed the series' cancellation. The show also aired on the Independent Film Channel in the United States.

On June 2, 2011, during an interview, Dore made a mention of The Jon Dore Television Show Movie. It was presumed that a script entered development, but as of 2015, the project may be abandoned.

Episode format
Each half-hour episode revolves around the central character, Jon Dore, playing a pseudo-realistic version of himself.

At the beginning of each episode, Jon Dore can usually be seen contemplating a life choice, revelation, or combating/dealing with a singular global issue which will be the central plot element of each episode, and then usually introduces himself by saying "Hi. I'm TV's Jon Dore".  The format involves fictional scripted scenes of story intertwined with plot-related [specifically chosen] interviews.  The interviews involve Jon Dore sitting down in real-life interviews or interacting realistically [as in the case of a doctor visit] with somebody in real life, whose occupation or vocation is a position relatable to the story, as well as the progression of the story thus far (such as receiving an official sperm count at a donation clinic, near the end of an episode dealing with sexual fertility.)  The camera, usually operated solely by Jon Dore or by a small two-man crew [according to the show itself] catches the real-life reactions of the interviewees as well as Jon Dore's antics as he proposes often ludicrous, comical, uncomfortable, and seemingly realistic [with comic connotations] questions and circumstances.

As the real-life interviews which help to forward the story end, they are usually closed-off with Jon Dore and the crew exiting or on set of the location, with Jon often breaking the fourth wall and becoming heavily camera conscious, adverse to the conventional methodology of standard contemporary reality TV shows (such as Kathy Griffin's My Life on the D-List, which follows a similar albeit fully non-fictional format accompanying little camera-interaction).  Also, further adding to the oft increasingly confusing presentation of each episode, Jon Dore is seen discussing a joke or plot element with the writers in an apparent "writer's room," referencing a concurrent or preceding episode element, and the path and discussion that involved its inception into the final episode.

At the end of each show, Jon is shown contemplating the events of the episode and explaining his feelings about them to the audience.  The host closes every episode with the phrase "I'm Jon Dore, thank you for watching television".

Jon Dore has confirmed that the show has been canceled, reruns occasionally air on The Comedy Network and IFC.

Recurring guests
Therapist Susan Lynne has appeared as Jon Dore's therapist in several episodes. Ms. Lynne is an actual Toronto-based therapist who was approached by the show's producers to appear in an episode. She was later asked to reprise her role when her interaction with Jon was found to work well on-screen. The dialogue between Jon and Susan is unscripted, with Susan attempting to engage Jon as if he were an actual client, despite his exaggerated 'personal issues'.

Awards and nominations
2008, Jon Dore, Mark Forward, Steve Patterson were winners of 'Best Series Writing' at the Canadian Comedy Awards
2009, Adam Brodie and Dave Derewlany, winners for 'best direction' (episode "Jon Gets Haunted"), at the Canadian Comedy Awards
2009, Jon Dore,  winner for 'best performance (male)', at the Canadian Comedy Awards
2009, Matt Hawkins, nominated for best direction, episode "Jon Gets Horny", at Canadian Comedy Awards

Episodes

References

External links
Comedy Network Jon Dore Television Show Homepage
Comedy Network Press Release

Jon Dore Biography ComedyNightLife.com
Homepage of Susan Lynne, Therapist

2000s Canadian satirical television series
2007 Canadian television series debuts
2009 Canadian television series endings
CTV Comedy Channel original programming
Canadian mockumentary television series